In 0 to ∞ is an album by Acid Mothers Temple & The Melting Paraiso U.F.O., released in 2010 by Important Records. The album is a follow-up to their 2001 cover of Terry Riley's In C.

Release

The album was released on CD and LP. The LP release was limited to 100 copies on yellow vinyl and 100 copies on clear vinyl. The remaining 800 copies will be on standard vinyl.

Track listing

Personnel

 Tsuyama Atsushi - monster bass, voice, soprano sax, recorder, chimpo pipe, temple block, cosmic joker
 Higashi Hiroshi - synthesizer, dancin'king
 Shimura Koji - drums, Latino cool
 Ichiraku Yoshimitsu - drums, doravideo
 Kawabata Makoto - guitar, organ, synthesizer, analog guitar synthesizer, gong, glockenspiel, tape-loop, voice, speed guru

Guests

 Cotton Casino - voice

Technical personnel

 produced & engineered by Kawabata Makoto

References

External links
 In 0 to ∞ at acidmothers.com

2010 albums
Acid Mothers Temple albums
Important Records albums